Jacob Joseph McCarthy (born July 30, 1997) is an American professional baseball outfielder for the Arizona Diamondbacks of Major League Baseball (MLB). He made his MLB debut in 2021.

Amateur career
McCarthy attended Scranton High School in Scranton, Pennsylvania. He was drafted by the Pittsburgh Pirates in the 23rd round of the 2015 Major League Baseball Draft, but did not sign and played college baseball at the University of Virginia. In 2017, he played collegiate summer baseball with the Harwich Mariners of the Cape Cod Baseball League. After three seasons at Virginia, where he stole 36 bases in 38 attempts while batting .337/.423/.476, he was drafted by the Arizona Diamondbacks in the competitive balance round A of the 2018 MLB draft.

Professional career
McCarthy made his professional debut with the Arizona League Diamondbacks before being promoted to the Hillsboro Hops. He played 2019 with the Visalia Rawhide, batting .277/.341/.405 in 195 at bats with 18 steals in 20 attempts, and after the season played in the Arizona Fall League.
 

He did not play a minor league game in 2020 due to the cancellation of the minor league season caused by the COVID-19 pandemic. McCarthy started 2021 with the Amarillo Sod Poodles before being promoted to the Reno Aces. Between the two teams he batted .253/.332/.500 with 29 steals in 33 attempts.

The Diamondbacks promoted McCarthy to the major leagues on August 27, 2021. On August 29, McCarthy collected his first career hit, an RBI double off of Philadelphia Phillies starter Ranger Suárez. McCarthy finished the 2021 major league season with a .220/.333/.373 slash line, with 13 hits, 3 doubles, 2 home runs, 4 RBI, and 8 walks, all in 24 games.

In 2022 he batted .283/.342/.427 in 321 at bats, with 23 stolen bases in 26 attempts. He had the fastest sprint speed of all major league right fielders, at 30.1 feet/second.

Personal life
His brother, Joe McCarthy, plays baseball in the Rangers organization.

References

External links

Living people
Sportspeople from Scranton, Pennsylvania
Baseball players from Pennsylvania
Major League Baseball outfielders
Arizona Diamondbacks players
Virginia Cavaliers baseball players
Harwich Mariners players
Arizona League Diamondbacks players
Hillsboro Hops players
Visalia Rawhide players
Salt River Rafters players
Amarillo Sod Poodles players
Reno Aces players
1997 births